Ferdinand is the outermost retrograde irregular satellite of Uranus. It was first seen near Uranus by Matthew J. Holman, John J. Kavelaars, Dan Milisavljevic, and Brett J. Gladman on August 13, 2001 and reobserved on September 21, 2001. The object was then lost with no confirmation it was actually orbiting around Uranus.

On August 29 and 30, 2003 a team led by Scott S. Sheppard surveyed the sky around Uranus with the Subaru telescope and detected two unknown objects near Uranus.  These two new objects were reobserved by Sheppard et al. with the Gemini telescope on September 20, 2003 and reported to the Minor Planet Center as possible new moons of Uranus.  On September 24, 2003, Brian G. Marsden, at the Minor Planet Center, linked one of the unknown objects reported by Sheppard et al. to the lost object observed by Holman et al. in 2001.  Holman was then able to confirm the linkage between the 2001 and 2003 objects on September 30, 2003 by observing its location with the Magellan-Baade telescope.  The linked 2001 and 2003 object was then given the provisional designation S/2001 U 2 on October 1, 2003, officially identifying it as a new moon of Uranus.  Now designated Uranus XXIV, Ferdinand is named after the son of the King of Naples in William Shakespeare's play The Tempest.

The second new object observed by Sheppard et al. in 2003 was also a new moon of Uranus, now named Margaret.

Orbit 

Ferdinand is the most distant known satellite of Uranus. It follows a retrograde, modestly inclined but highly eccentric orbit.
The diagram illustrates the orbital parameters of the retrograde irregular satellites of Uranus (in polar co-ordinates) with the eccentricity of the orbits represented by the segments extending from the pericentre to the apocentre.

See also 

 Uranus' natural satellites

References

External links 
 Ferdinand Profile by NASA's Solar System Exploration
 David Jewitt pages
 Uranus' Known Satellites (by Scott S. Sheppard)
 MPC: Natural Satellites Ephemeris Service

Moons of Uranus
Irregular satellites
 
20010813
Moons with a retrograde orbit